The Elephant Sanctuary in Tennessee in Hohenwald, Tennessee, is a non-profit organization licensed by the U.S. Department of Agriculture (USDA) and the Tennessee Wildlife Resources Agency (TWRA), and a member of the Association of Zoos (AZA). Founded in 1995, The Sanctuary has provided a home to 28 elephants, all retired from zoos and circuses. The Elephant Sanctuary provides these elephants with a natural habitat, individualized care for life, and the opportunity to live out their lives in a safe haven dedicated to their well being. The elephant habitats are not open to the public.

The Elephant Sanctuary in Tennessee has a four-star rating from Charity Navigator.

History
In 1995, Carol Buckley purchased a 113 acre parcel of land in Lewis County, Tennessee, and built a barn to retire her elephant Tarra. Shortly after The Elephant Sanctuary(TES) was established and acquired their non profit status. In 1999 the property was purchased from Buckley by the non profit organization. Buckley was the guarantor for the loan for second barn added in 1999 at which time 4 elephants had been rescued and living with Tarra. In 2001, a  section of land with a  lake was acquired. Again Buckley was the guarantor for the loan. The first two African elephants were accepted for the new African habitat in 2004. The existing herd of Asian elephants, now numbering 7, was relocated to a new  habitat to accommodate eight incoming elephants who needed to be quarantined in 2005. This new area includes a  barn and  hay barn which is able to hold up to 35,000 bales of hay.

Facilities
The development of the Sanctuary was done in several stages. It was originally built in phases and then expanded whenever funding was available or the elephants needed more space or accommodation. Twenty miles of double fencing encloses The Elephant Sanctuary's . Heated barns located in the Asia, Africa, and Quarantine Habitats offer additional warmth during the cooler winter months. The Asia and Africa barn designed were conceptualized by co-founders Carol Buckley and Scott Blais and were constructed using Leadership in Environmental and Energy design plans. The facilities have many features that protect the environment and reduce their carbon footprint.

Education
The Elephant Sanctuary's Elephant Discovery Center, opened in 2019, hosts drop-in visitors Saturdays 9 AM to 4 PM. Although the visitors cannot physically see the elephants (in keeping with Sanctuary philosophy), they can interact with staff and watch the elephants via live-streaming EleCams. The Discovery Center also provides in-person programs for school groups, civic/social groups, and the general public upon request.

The Sanctuary also has a web-based Distance Learning program that allows The Sanctuary to link up with classrooms and other audiences online. These programs are also available upon request.

References

2. Leaving Time by Jodi Picoult https://jodipicoult.com/leaving-time.html

External links
 The Elephant Sanctuary official website

Animal charities based in the United States
Charities based in Tennessee
Buildings and structures in Lewis County, Tennessee
Wildlife sanctuaries of the United States
Environmental organizations based in Tennessee
Elephant conservation